Linton Kwesi Johnson (born 24 August 1952), also known as LKJ, is a Jamaica-born, British-based dub poet and activist. In 2002 he became the second living poet, and the only black one, to be published in the Penguin Modern Classics series. His performance poetry involves the recitation of his own verse in Jamaican patois over dub-reggae, usually written in collaboration with reggae producer/artist Dennis Bovell.

Early life
Johnson was born in Chapelton, a small town in the rural parish of Clarendon, Jamaica. His middle name, "Kwesi", is a Ghanaian name that is given to boys who, like Johnson, are born on a Sunday. In 1963 he and his father came to live in Brixton, London, joining his mother, who had immigrated to Britain as part of the Windrush generation shortly before Jamaican independence in 1962. Johnson attended Tulse Hill School in Lambeth. While still at school he joined the British Black Panther Movement, helped to organise a poetry workshop within the movement, and developed his work with Rasta Love, a group of poets and drummers.

Johnson studied sociology at Goldsmiths College in New Cross, London, graduating in 1973. Speaking in a 2018 interview about his start as a poet, he said: "I began to write verse, not only because I liked it, but because it was a way of expressing the anger, the passion of the youth of my generation in terms of our struggle against racial oppression. Poetry was a cultural weapon in the black liberation struggle, so that's how it began." During the early to mid-1970s he was employed as the first paid library resources and education officer at the Keskidee Centre, where his poem Voices of the living and the dead was staged, produced by Jamaica novelist Lindsay Barrett, with music by the reggae group Rasta Love. Johnson has recalled: "it was fantastic, you know, having written something and having it staged with actors and musicians. That was back in 1973 before I had a poem published anywhere. That was before anyone had ever heard of Linton Kwesi Johnson."

Johnson wrote for New Musical Express, Melody Maker, and Black Music in the 1970s. As a freelancer for Virgin Records he wrote biographies for their reggae artists, sleeve notes and copy for adverts.

Career

Poetry 

Most of Johnson's poetry is political, dealing mainly with the experiences of being an African-Caribbean in Britain: "Writing was a political act and poetry was a cultural weapon...", he told an interviewer in 2008. However, he has also written about other issues, such as British foreign policy and the death of anti-racist marcher Blair Peach. Johnson wrote "Reggae fi Dada" on the death of his father in 1982, blaming social conditions. His most celebrated poems were written during the government of Prime Minister Margaret Thatcher. The poems contain graphic accounts of the racist police brutality occurring at the time (cf. "Sonny's Lettah"). Johnson's poetry makes clever use of the unstandardised transcription of Jamaican patois.

Johnson's poems first appeared in the journal Race Today, which published his first collection of poetry, Voices of the Living and the Dead, in 1974. Dread Beat An' Blood, his second collection, was published in 1975 by Bogle-L'Ouverture.

A collection of his poems has been published as Mi Revalueshanary Fren by Penguin Modern Classics. Johnson is one of only three poets to be published by Penguin Modern Classics while still alive.

Music 

Johnson's best-known albums include his debut Dread Beat an' Blood (1978), Forces of Victory (1979), Bass Culture (1980),  LKJ in Dub (1980), and Making History (1983). Across them are spread classics of the dub poetry school of performance – and of reggae itself – such as "Dread Beat An' Blood", "Sonny's Lettah", "Inglan Is A Bitch", "Independent Intavenshan" and "All Wi Doin Is Defendin".
His poem Di Great Insohreckshan is his response to the 1981 Brixton riots. The work was the subject of a BBC Radio 4 programme in 2007.

Johnson's work, allied to the Jamaican "toasting" tradition, is regarded as an essential precursor of rap.

Johnson's record label LKJ Records, launched in 1981, is home to other reggae artists, some of whom made up the Dub Band, with whom Johnson mostly recorded, and other dub poets, such as Jean "Binta" Breeze. Past releases on the label include recordings by Mikey Smith.

Awards and honours

Johnson received a C. Day-Lewis Fellowship in 1977, and that year became writer-in-residence for the London Borough of Lambeth. He was made an Associate Fellow of Warwick University in 1985 and an Honorary Fellow of Wolverhampton Polytechnic in 1987, and in 1990 received an award at the XIII Premio Internazionale Ultimo Novecento from the city of Pisa for his contribution to poetry and popular music. In 1998 he was awarded the Premio Piero Ciampi Citta di Livorno Concorso Musicale Nazionale in Italy.

In 2003 Johnson was bestowed with an honorary fellowship from his alma mater, Goldsmiths College, University of London. In 2004 he became an Honorary Visiting Professor of Middlesex University in London. In 2005 he was awarded a silver Musgrave Medal from the Institute of Jamaica for distinguished eminence in the field of poetry. In 2012, he was awarded the Golden PEN Award by English PEN for "a Lifetime's Distinguished Service to Literature".

He is a Trustee of the George Padmore Institute (GPI), and is a contributor to the GPI's collection of dialogues Changing Britannia: Life Experience With Britain, edited by Roxy Harris and Sarah White (New Beacon Books, 1999).

In August 2014 it was announced that he would receive the Jamaican national honour of the Order of Distinction in October that year.

On 20 April 2017 he was awarded an Honorary Doctorate of Literature (D.Litt.) by Rhodes University in South Africa.

In July 2020 Johnson was awarded the PEN Pinter Prize – established in Harold Pinter's name to defend freedom of expression and celebrate literature – for his commitment to political expression in his work. Announcing the award, the judges described Johnson as "a living legend", "a poet, reggae icon, academic and campaigner, whose impact on the cultural landscape over the last half century has been colossal and multi-generational.... His political ferocity and his tireless scrutiny of history are truly Pinteresque, as is the humour with which he pursues them."

Johnson is chair of 198 Contemporary Arts and Learning, an art gallery and learning institution in Brixton.

Bibliography
 Voices of the Living and the Dead – Creation for Liberation, 1974. 
 Dread Beat An' Blood – Bogle-L'Ouverture Publications, 1975. 
 Inglan is a Bitch – Race Today, 1980. 
 Tings An' Times – Bloodaxe Books, 1991. 
 Mi Revalueshanary Fren: Selected Poems – Penguin Modern Classics, 2002; 2006.

Discography 
 Dread Beat an' Blood – Virgin, 1978 (as Poet and the Roots).
 Forces of Victory – Island, 1979.
 Bass Culture – Island, 1980.
 The Best of Linton Kwesi Johnson – Epic, 1980 (compilation).
 LKJ in Dub – Island, 1980.
 Making History – Island, 1983.
 Reggae Greats – Mango, 1984 (compilation).
 In Concert with the Dub Band – LKJ Records, 1985.
 Dub Poetry – Mango, 1985 (compilation).
 Tings an' Times – LKJ Records, 1991.
 LKJ in Dub: Volume 2 – LKJ Records, 1992.
 LKJ Presents – LKJ Records, 1996.
 A Cappella Live – LKJ Records, 1996.
 Independent Intavenshan – Island, 1998 (compilation).
 More Time – LKJ Records, 1999.
 LKJ in Dub: Volume 3 – LKJ Records, 2002.
 Straight to Inglan's Head – Universal, 2003 (compilation).
 Live in Paris – Wrasse, 2004.

References

External links 

 LKJ Records – News, releases, tour dates, etc.
  includes a "Critical Perspective" section
 Spike Magazine interview
 Interview with Yuri Prasad in Socialist Review (2002)
 "Linton Kwesi Johnson", The Poetry Archive
 "Linton Kwesi Johnson performs If I Woz a Tap Natch Poet", The Guardian, 11 December 2008.
Discography at Discogs
 "Poetic justice: black lives and the power of poetry", The Observer, 28 June 2020.

1952 births
Jamaican emigrants to the United Kingdom
Alumni of Goldsmiths, University of London
Black British musicians
Black British writers
Fellows of the Royal Society of Literature
20th-century British poets
21st-century British poets
21st-century British male writers
British reggae musicians
People from Clarendon Parish, Jamaica
Jamaican dub poets
Jamaican male writers
Island Records artists
Wrasse Records artists
Recipients of the Musgrave Medal
Living people
British spoken word artists
British male poets
Recipients of the Order of Distinction
20th-century British male writers